Pallavan Express is an Intercity express typed superfast service operated by the Southern Railway zone of the Indian Railways. This service connects the cities of Chennai  to Karaikudi via Tiruchirappalli in the Indian state of Tamil Nadu. The rakes of this train was upgraded to brand new modern LHB rakes from 30 June 2019. Pallavan Superfast is fondly known as "PRINCE OF CHORD LINE" along with Vaigai Superfast known as "CHORD LINE BROTHERS".

History

The Pallavan Express was introduced to run parallel to the Vaigai Express, which could not complete the round trip between Madurai and Chennai. The express was initially introduced on 15 August 1977 between Chennai and Madurai as a daily day express service with remaining rakes of Vaigai Superfast Express in the name of Madurai Summer Special supplying rakes for Vaigai Express at Chennai Egmore. 

On 15 August 1984, this train was named as "Pallavan Superfast Express" and made to run between Chennai Egmore and Tiruchchirappalli Junction. And its rakes are shared with Vaigai Super Fast Express at Chennai Egmore remains same. 29 years later, it was extended till Karaikudi, effective from 1 September 2013. The express along with Vaigai Superfast Express serves as fastest public commutation mode between Chennai and Trichy apart from air. The Express makes the  run in 6 hours 45 mins with only 12 stops.

It is the most popular day train for travel between Tiruchchirappalli Junction and Chennai Egmore. It maintains excellent speed in its whole way making the one-way trip in just over 5 hours as compared to the 79 hours by road. Pallavan Superfast is fondly called as "Prince of Chord line" and its Rake sharing partner Vaigai Superfast is known as "King of Chord line".

This train runs at its max permit speed 110 kmph between Chennai Egmore and Tiruchchirappalli.

Pictures

Schedule
The Pallavan Express departs Karaikudi Junction at 05:35 AM then reaches Tiruchirappalli Junction at 06:50 AM, and will reach its final destination Chennai Egmore at 12:15 PM

And 12605 Pallavan Express departs Chennai Egmore at 03:45 PM then arrives Tiruchirappalli Junction around 08:40 PM and reaches Karaikkudi Junction at 10:35 PM.

The train has one pantry car for providing continuous refreshment/food supply to passengers. Food fares are applicable and will be in good quality.

Locomotive
This train is being hauled by an electric locomotive WAP 7 from Electric Loco Shed, Royapuram between Chennai Egmore and Karaikudi Junction and vice versa.

Rakes 

Initially when introduced between Chennai and Tiruchchirappalli in 1984 YDM4 was used to haul this train in MG.

Then from 1999 this train was converted to broad gauge and GOC WDM series green livery alco hauled this train.

Chord line was electrified and from 2012, this train used AJJ/ED WAP4 or RPM/ED WAP7 between Chennai and Tiruchchirappalli.

After getting extended to Karaikkudi a GOC WDP4 series or GOC WDM series was usually made as onlink for this train between Tiruchchirappalli and Karaikkudi.

The rakes are maintained at Madurai.

Demands
There are also demands to extend this train from Karaikudi Junction to Manamadurai Junction which is further 62 kms away from Karaikudi junction along with a stoppage at Sivaganga.

Accident
On 25 April 2018, Front wheels of WDP4D numbered 40405 which hauled 12606 UP Karaikkudi - Chennai Pallavan Superfast Express derailed while entering Tiruchchirappalli Junction railway station at 6:27 am. It was reported due to rail fracture, no injures and casualties reported. Then train was moved further with the delay of three hours towards Chennai.

See also 
 Cholan Express
 Vaigai Express
 Rockfort Express
 Mysore-Mayiladuthurai Express
 Pearl City Express.
 Kanniyakumari Express
 Tambaram–Nagercoil Antyodaya Express

Notes

References

External links

 Southern Railway

Transport in Chennai
Named passenger trains of India
Express trains in India
Rail transport in Tamil Nadu
Railway services introduced in 1984